Nenu Meeku Baaga Kavalsinavaadini is a 2022 Indian Telugu-language romantic comedy film directed by Sridhar Gade and written by Kiran Abbavaram. It stars Abbavaram, Sanjana Anand  and Sonu Thakur. The film has music composed by Mani Sharma.

Nenu Meeku Baaga Kavalsinavaadini was released theatrically on 16 September 2022.

Plot 
A sympathetic cabbie named Vivek (Kiran Abbavaram) lends a distressed woman named Teju a shoulder to cry on after coming to know that she has been aloof from her family post her estrangement from them following the cancellation of her wedding. Just as love blossoms in her heart, Vivek reveals a best-kept secret. Is there a commonality that brings them together?

Cast 

 Kiran Abbavaram as Vivek/Pavan
 Sanjana Anand as Theju
 Sonu Thakur as Lawyer Durga
 Siddharth Menon as Siddhu/Kalyaan
 S. V. Krishna Reddy as Theju's father
 Baba Bhaskar as Pavan's uncle
 Sameer as Theju's uncle
 Getup Srinu
 Sangeetha
 Niharika
 Pramodini
 Bharat Rongali as Security Guard
 Divya Rahlan special appearance in the song "Attaanti Ittaanti"
 Jabardast Nukaraju

Reception 
The Times of India critic Paul Nicodemus stated that "though not groundbreaking, this masala entertainer is a decent effort by Sridhar Gadhe and the team that would appeal to the audiences looking for lighthearted entertainment." Sakshi gave a mixed review for the film, appreciating the performances and music while criticizing the screenplay. Eenadu also echoed the same, stating the film follows a routine format without bringing any novelty. 123telugu.com stated that, "[The film] is a romantic family drama which lacks strong emotions. The music and a few comedy scenes are good but the lack of gripping narration makes the film a dull and boring watch this weekend and has nothing new to showcase."

Lakshminarayana Varanasi of TV9 Telugu felt the film suffers from lackluster screenplay. A reviewer from Pinkvilla wrote "The film under review is a heady concoction of a convenient turn of events, followed by a bunch of sorry cliches."

References

External links 
 

2020s Telugu-language films
2022 romantic comedy films
Indian romantic comedy films
Films scored by Mani Sharma